Nappy is a term in the English language in Australia, Ireland, New Zealand, South Africa, United Kingdom, and Zimbabwe for a diaper.

Nappy may also refer to:
 Nappy Creek, a stream in Alaska
Nappy Valley, a term for a neighbourhood with a large number of families with young children
 Nappy Brown, stage name of American R&B singer Napoleon Brown Goodson Culp (1929-2008)
 Joseph Nappy Lamare (1905-1988), American jazz banjoist, guitarist and singer
 Nappy, an adjective for Afro-textured hair (often offensive)